Sony Movies (also known as Sony Movie Channel) is an American cable television channel that was launched on . Owned by the Sony Pictures Television subsidiary of Sony Group Corporation, its programming consists of films from the Sony Pictures Entertainment library (including content from Columbia Pictures, TriStar Pictures, Sony Pictures Classics and Destination Films among others), alongside films from other distributors, mainly from Millennium Films, Nu Image, Lionsgate Films and Shout! Factory, which are broadcast unedited, and remastered in 1080i high definition.

Program blocks and theme weeks
A former program block on the channel is "Killer Mandays", a double feature of horror films on Monday nights. From November 6 – 12, 2011 the channel aired a week-long salute to Bollywood films.

Availability
Sony Movies is available nationally on Philo, DirecTV and Dish Network, and regionally on AT&T U-Verse, Suddenlink, Optimum. DirecTV and Dish Network also offer "Sony Movie Channel Everywhere", which allows viewers to watch its movies through its website for no additional cost. The channel is also available through streaming for owners of the Sony Network Media Player.

References

External links
 

Television channels and stations established in 2010
Television networks in the United States
Movie channels
Sony
Sony Pictures Entertainment
Sony Pictures Television
Commercial-free television networks
Cable television in the United States
HD-only channels